Monroe Precinct is located in Hardin County, Illinois, USA.  As of the 2000 census, its population was 691.

Geography

References

Precincts in Hardin County, Illinois